Saj may refer to:

 Saj (bread)
 Saj (utensil)
 Saj', Arabic literary genre
 Saj, Iran, a village in Qazvin Province
 Saj, the tree Terminalia elliptica
 Saj (Coronation Street), TV character
 Sahu language, ISO 639-3 language code

SAJ may refer to:
 Scout Association of Japan
 Sir Anerood Jugnauth, former President and PM of Mauritius
 Special Anti-Terrorist Unit (Serbia)
 St Johns railway station, London, England, National Rail station code
 Finnish Trade Union Federation
 Finnish Trade Union Federation (1960)